Toijala railway station is located in the Toijala district of the town of Akaa, Finland.

The station is located at a crossing point of three different railway tracks: from Riihimäki to Tampere, from Turku to Toijala, and from Toijala to Valkeakoski. Originally, all three tracks served both personnel and cargo traffic, but personnel traffic to Valkeakoski was discontinued in 1956. Nowadays, all passenger trains between Helsinki and Tampere, except Pendolino trains, and all trains from Turku to Tampere and on towards Oulu and Pieksämäki stop at Toijala. Toijala also serves InterCity and InterCity² trains and local trains.

References 

Akaa
Railway stations in Pirkanmaa